The Gare de Thionville is a railway station serving the town of Thionville in the Moselle department, Lorraine, north-eastern France. It is situated on four railways including the Metz–Luxembourg railway and the Thionville–Trier railway.

Services

The station is served by high speed trains towards Luxembourg and Paris, and regional trains towards Metz, Trier, Luxembourg and Longwy.

References

External links
Timetables TER Grand Est 

Railway stations in Moselle (department)
Railway stations in France opened in 1854